Howison is an unincorporated community located in Harrison County, Mississippi.

Howison is located on the Kansas City Southern Railway. The Native Lumber Company was incorporated in Howison in 1899 and operated a sawmill there.

A post office operated under the name Howison from 1897 to 1953.

Howison was also once home to an express mail office.

References

Unincorporated communities in Harrison County, Mississippi
Unincorporated communities in Mississippi
Gulfport–Biloxi metropolitan area